The Mavala is a Title used for the Kolis of Maval region. Most of the inhabitants of maval region were Mahadeo Kolis. Maval region, also known as Bavan Mavals (52 valley), was known as Koli country and each Mavals were under the control of Koli chief or Nayaks. The Koli community made a substantial contribution to the success of the Swarajya movement of Shivaji. The 'Koli Chauthara' in Shivneri fort still stands as a monument to the Kolis' love of independence.

During the time of Maratha leader, Shivaji in 17th century, the title was exclusively used for people belonging to the peasant Kolis and Kunbi community of the region but Kunbis of Maval region were Kolis who were settled as Agriculturist. They were expert footmen and excelled in mountain warfare. Shivaji raised an infantry of Mavale who used guerilla tactics of hit and run to inflict heavy losses on numerically stronger enemies. The infantry was considered the backbone of his power, and according to Sabhasad Bakhar, which chronicled Shivaji's life, the Mavale and Hasham infantry of Shivaji had 100,000 men. Kolis who were known as the names of Mavala Sardars earned the Naikwadis.

Notable 
 Tanaji Malusare, Koli chief of Mavala warriors who fought the battle of Sinhagad.

In popular culture 
 In the hindi movie Tanhaji, actor Ajay Devgn played the role of Mavala leader, Tanaji Malusare

See also 
 List of Koli people
 List of Koli states and clans
 Maratha Empire

References

 

History of Maharashtra
Koli titles
Koli people
People from Pune district